Magarabomba is a village and consejo popular in the Camagüey Province of Cuba. It is part of the municipality of Céspedes.

Geography

Demographics
Population by year:

 1857: 23 formed by five groups of houses.
 1910: 225
 1919: 3,642
 1931: 14,025
 1943: 14,996
 2011: 1,593

References

Populated places in Camagüey Province
Florida, Cuba